Snippaker Creek Cone is a cinder cone of the Iskut-Unuk River Cones group in northwestern British Columbia, Canada, located near the western flank of Cinder Mountain. It last erupted during the Holocene epoch.

See also
List of volcanoes in Canada
List of Northern Cordilleran volcanoes
Volcanology of Canada
Volcanology of Western Canada

References

Cinder cones of British Columbia
Northern Cordilleran Volcanic Province
Boundary Ranges